Jungle Gold  is an American reality television series on the Discovery Channel that debuted on October 26, 2012. It ran for two seasons.

Synopsis
The series follows Scott Lomu and George Wright as they join the lucrative African gold rush in an attempted high-risk financial recovery from having lost everything in the real estate crash of 2008. It focuses on the duo as they encounter the task of gold placer mining in the Ashanti Belt along the Birim River in Ghana of West Africa. The men used excavators, trommels and water pumps to mine for gold. In the first season, the nearest town to their claim is Romaso, in the Ashanti Region. In the second season, the nearest town is Fahiakobo, both close to each other, with the nearest city being Dunkwa-On-Offin. Filming for the second season started on March 6, 2013, with the season premiering on August 11, 2013.

The second season of filming in Ghana was cut short, following an attack on a site nearby by armed militia. The attack resulted in the severe injury of mining partner Allen Reece, and prompted the crew to evacuate the region in fear of their own safety. After relocating to the TV production headquarters in Domenase, Scott and George learned that the Ghanaian Minister for Lands and Natural Resources (Inusah Fuseini) had issued an arrest warrant for them, along with the entire Discovery Channel film crew, in reaction to their exploits shown in the first season (which had just aired in Ghana), because it depicted what many Ghanaian nationals considered illegal mining activity. Scott and George maintain that they have always operated in compliance with Ghanaian law but fled from Ghana with the assistance of the Discovery Channel production crew, rather than risk up to 5 years in a Ghanaian prison awaiting trial. The evacuation and drama surrounding it was shown in the final episode of season 2. Following the incident, Scott and George elected to sell all of their machinery, and focus on other business ventures.

Episodes

Season 1 (2012)

Season 2 (2013)

Syndication
The series has been syndicated on the following networks and titles:

  Discovery Channel Canada: Jungle Gold
  Discovery Channel UK: Jungle Gold
  Discovery Channel Poland: 
  Discovery Channel Netherlands: Jungle Gold
  Discovery Channel Denmark: Jungle Gold
  Discovery Channel Sweden: Jungle Gold
  Discovery Channel Norway: Jungle Gold
  : 
   DMAX: 
   Discovery Channel Australia: Jungle Gold
  Discovery Channel India: Jungle Gold
 (Discovery (телеканал)): Золото джунглей

See also
 Mining industry of Ghana

References

External links
 Discovery Channel (USA): Jungle Gold
 Discovery Channel Canada: Jungle Gold
 Discovery Channel UK: Jungle Gold

2010s American reality television series
2012 American television series debuts
English-language television shows
Discovery Channel original programming
2013 American television series endings
Television shows filmed in Ghana